White Nights (Hungarian: Fehér éjszakák) is a 1916 Hungarian silent drama film directed by Alexander Korda and starring Lili Berky, Kálmán Körmendy and György Kürthy. It was based on the play Fédora by Victorien Sardou and is sometimes known by the alternative title Fédora. It was Korda's first film for the Corvin Film studio. It was a major success and was one of the first Hungarian films to be exported to other countries.

Cast
 Lili Berky
 Kálmán Körmendy 
 György Kürthy
 Andor Szakács
 Rezső Harsányi
 Valeria Berlányi
 Aranka Laczkó
 József Berky

References

Bibliography
 Kulik, Karol. Alexander Korda: The Man Who Could Work Miracles. Virgin Books, 1990.

External links

1916 films
Hungarian silent films
Hungarian drama films
1910s Hungarian-language films
Films directed by Alexander Korda
Hungarian films based on plays
Films based on works by Victorien Sardou
1916 Austro-Hungarian films
Hungarian black-and-white films
1916 drama films
Silent drama films